Salvadoran Spanish is geographically defined as the form of Spanish spoken in the country of El Salvador. The Spanish dialect in El Salvador shares many similarities to that of its neighbors in the region, but it has its stark differences in pronunciation and usage. El Salvador, like most of Central America, uses voseo Spanish as its written and spoken form, similar to that of Argentina. Vos is used, but many Salvadorans understand tuteo. Vos can be heard in television programs and can be seen in written form in publications. Usted is used as a show of respect, when someone is speaking to an elderly person.

Phonetics and phonology
Notable characteristics of Salvadoran phonology include the following:
Seseo is common to Andalusian, Canarian, and all Latin American Spanish varieties.
 Syllable-final  is realized as glottal  (mainly on the Eastern departments as Usulután and San Miguel). In the casual speech of some speakers, this may also occur syllable-initially. This is most common word-medially, in an unstressed position, as in   'house', and is much less common in a word-initial stressed position, as in   'century'. Syllable-final [s] is always or mostly pronounced in the formal speech, like TV broadcasts. 
  is realized as glottal .
 Intervocalic  often disappears; the ending  is often .
 Word-final  is pronounced velar .

Pronouns and verb conjugation

Voseo

In El Salvador, as in the other Central American nations,  is the dominant second person singular pronoun used by many speakers in familiar or informal contexts. Voseo is most commonly used among people in the same age group in addressing one another. It is common to hear young children address each other with "vos." The phenomenon also occurs among adults who address one another in familiar or informal contexts. "Vos" is also used by adults in addressing children or juveniles. However, the relationship does not reoccur when children address adults. Children address adults with usted regardless of age, status or context.

Ustedeo

"Usted" is the formal second person singular pronoun in Salvadoran Castilian.  "Usted" is used in addressing foreigners formally, for acquaintances, and in business settings. Unlike nearby Costa Rica, "usted" is not the dominant second person pronoun for addressing a person.

Tuteo

 is hardly used, though it is occasionally present between Salvadorans who aren't imitating foreign speech. It is used in addressing foreigners familiarly and when writing correspondence to foreigners (again in familiar contexts).

Postposed pronouns
In El Salvador, and neighboring areas of Honduras and Guatemala, or more rarely , may be added to the end of a sentence to reiterate the listener's participation. This constitutes free use of the pronoun, unconnected to any of the arguments in the preceding sentence. Little is known about this phenomenon's origins.

Syntax 
Very rarely the possessive can be combined with a demonstrative pronoun, like  . This construction was occasional in Old Spanish and still found in Judaeo-Spanish, but its frequency in El Salvador and Guatemala is due to similar constructions being found in various Mayan languages.

Salvadoran Caliche/Caliche Salvadoreño
The definition for Caliche is an informal term for Salvadoran Spanish due to colloquialisms and unique indigenous lexical words that are different from Salvadoran Spanish.  Caliche refers to the Nawat (Pipil) influenced dialect of Spanish spoken in El Salvador.  Many words have gone through the process of deletion, vowel assimilation, or epenthesis to make it easier for the speaker to understand. Salvadoran Caliche is used across social classes, although professional individuals tend to avoid it because it is not considered "proper" Spanish.

For example, this table shows the difference between Standard Salvadoran Spanish and Caliche:

Words like this are not unique to El Salvador, and when heard by someone that is Salvadoran or from neighbouring countries they are understood. Nawat's influence appears in the word , which means "breast". But chiche in El Salvador also means "easy”. This word does not appear in any dictionary so its origin cannot be traced, but the only hypothesis behind this word was proposed by Pedro Geoffroy Rivas—an anthropologist, poet, and linguist—who believed that it came from the Pipil language, since El Salvador's Spanish has been heavily influenced by it.
 
Unfortunately, Caliche is not described in studies on Salvadoran Spanish. The philologist John M. Lipski points out that Centro American Spanish (including the Spanish spoken in El Salvador) lacks adequate sources for linguistic and literary research.  Lipski further elaborates that such linguistic shortage indicates a possible generalization that in recent decades Salvadoran dialectology has failed to advance as rapidly as the comparative work in other Latin American nations.

See also

References

Sources

Further reading

 Aaron, Jessi Elana (University of Florida) and José Esteban Hernández (University of Texas, Pan-American). "Quantitative evidence for contact-induced accommodation: Shifts in /s/ reduction patterns in Salvadoran Spanish in Houston". In: Potowski, Kim and Richard Cameron (editors). Spanish in Contact: Policy, Social and Linguistic Inquiries (Volume 22 of Impact, studies in language and society). John Benjamins Publishing, 2007. Start page 329. , .

Central American Spanish
Languages of El Salvador